Fürstlich Sächsischer Hofbuchdruckerei of Altenburg, Germany, is used generically in this article to denote a succession of book printers (sometimes synonymous with "publishers") based in Altenburg, in the German state of Thuringia (formerly East Germany), that — under various capacities, names, and owners – have endured as one continuous printing operation, without interruption (save and except wars), for  years — since 1594, the early modern German period.  The bookbinding aspect of the business included a bindery.

History

16th century 
The Fürstlich Sächsische Hofdruckerei, the ducal printing press, was established at the Hartenfels Castle (de) in Torgau in 1594 by appointment of Friedrich Wilhelm I, Duke of Saxe-Weimar (1562–1602). "Fürstlich Sächsische" roughly translates to "Prince of Saxony."  The German prefix "Hof," an abbreviation for "Hoflieferant," denotes a royal appointment.  The German word "druckerie" translates to "printer."  The earliest extant publication is Torgauer Katechismus (Torgau Catechism).

17th century 
In 1604, after the duke's death, the press moved to Altenburg.  The earliest extant published work from the Altenburg press is Lotio Pedum (1606). In 1668, Gottfried Richter (1633–1696) received the book printing concession and, two years later, received the privilege of being a court publisher.  During this period, his printing press was among the 20 known to produce the Biblia Germanica, the Luther Bible (1676), with the woodcut engravings of Jakob Mores (Mörs) (lived approx. 1540–1612).

18th century 
In 1709, Johann Ludwig Richter, one of Gottfried's sons, purchased the royal publishing house from Duke Ernest and, henceforth, it became known as Richter'sche Hofbuchdruckerei. Johann Ludwig Richter was appointed F.S. (Fürstlich Sächsischer) Hoff-buchdruckern and headed the firm until his death in 1736.  His son, Paul Emanuel Richter, ran it from 1736 to 1742.  The last owner, Karl Heinrich Emanuel Richter (1778–1800?), was young when he won control of the firm.  Due partly to his inexperience and partly to a downturn in the economy, K.H.E. Richter sold the Hofbuchdruckdruckerei in 1799 under financial duress, mostly from pressure of creditors.  K.H.E. Richter, who also was in the bookselling business, sold, in the same year, parts of his bookselling business to Hieronymus Wilhelm Christian Seidler (1765–1811) from Jena.  Richter desired to continue as bookseller and did not want to lose his "Privilegium Exclusivum" (as a royal appointed book seller); but, lost it.  K.H.E. Richter contested the loss of his royal appointment.  His effort was an impetus for the founding of a publishing house that became Schnuphase'sche Buchhandlung of Altenburg, which was the forerunner to present-day firm, E. Reinhold Verlag (de).

19th century 

On 1 July 1799, the firm was acquired by Johann Friedrich Pierer (de) (1767–1832), and became known as Pierer'sche Hofbuchdruckerei.  Pierer was a physician and in 1826 became the official physician to the Duke.  The book publishing company was owned by the Pierer family until 1871. During this time, the firm achieved international acclaim with published works that included Pierer's Universal-Lexikon (de), an encyclopedia edited by Heinrich August Pierer (1st ed. 1824–1826). In 1843, Eugen Pierer (de) (1823–1890), one of H.A. Pierer's sons, joined the business.  The Leipzig-Altenburg Railway – completed September 19, 1842 – greatly enhanced the supply chain from Pierer'sche Hofbuchdruckerei to bookdealers in Leipzig.  The business managed to endure in the throes of the 1848 German revolution in Saxony.  Upon the death of H.A. Pierer in 1850, Eugen became the sole managing director.  In 1859, Eugen's brother, Alfred (1836–1901), joined the company and Eugen, henceforth, narrowed his responsibility to printing.

In 1872, the business was sold to a consortium of Leipzig publishers led by Stephan Geibel (1847–1903). In addition to Stephan Geibel, the consortium consisted of:
 Carl Geibel, Jr. (1842–1910), brother of Stephan, who with his father, Carl Geibel, Sr., around 1866, acquired the publishing firm of Duncker & Humblot (de)
 Richard Reisland (né Otto Richard Reisland; 1841–1915); in 1868, he became sole owner of Fues Verlag in Leipzig, which was founded in 1768 in Tübingen as L.W. Fues (Ludwig Friedrich Fues; 1765–1863); published works of Ferdinand Tönnies
 Otto Volckmar (né Otto Friedrich Friedrich Volckmar; 1835–1887), son of Friedrich Volckmar (de) (1799–1876)
 Carl Vörster (né Carl Frederich David Vörster; 1826–1899), son-in-law of Friedrich Volckmar
 Carl Geibel, Sr. (de) (1806-1884)

In 1874, Stephan Geibel, the youngest son of Carl Geibel, Sr., took over management and the firm became known as Offene Handelsgesellschaft (de) Pierer'sche Hofbuchdruckerei. Stephan Geibel & Co. Stephan was married to Wanda Geibel (née  von Rothkirch-Trach), a granddaughter of Heinrich August Pierer.

20th century 
In 1919, the firm was reorganized as a Kommanditgesellschaft (limited partnership). By the 1920s, the firm began specializing in scientific publications. By 1925, the managing directors were Hans Stephan Geibel (Stephan Geibel's son) and Paul Hoffmann — Hoffman had been managing director since the death of Stephen Geibel in 1903.

In 1931, Pierersche Hofbuchdruckerei Stefan Geibel & Co. KG was located at 30/31 Hohe Straße.  The personnel included Managing Director Hans Stephan Geibel, Director Curt Brandt, and authorized signatories Joachim von Baerensprung, Hanns Bretschneider, August Drescher, Hans Ernst, Heinrich Hansen.  The firm had 500 employees.  The equipment included 30 setting and casting machines, 45 printing machines, stereotypes, a font foundry, and a large bookbinding facility.

Post World War II 
At the end of April 1945, near the end of World War II, the company resumed operations. The U.S. 304th Infantry Regiment was initially stationed at Altenburg, then, in July 1945, Altenburg became part of the Soviet occupation zone.  After Germany split (into East and West Germany), the firm, domiciled in East Germany, was forced to provide extensive reparation services to SWA-Verlag in Weimar, publisher for the Soviet Military Administration in Germany, and, to that end, printed more than 28 million books from 1947 to 1949.

On the basis of a denunciation, the directors, Hans Stephan Geibel and Max A. Geibel, sons of Stephan Geibel, were arrested in March 1950 and sentenced to prison by the District Court of Gera (de) in October 1950. The firm's assets were confiscated by the state of Thuringia at the turn of 1950–1951, which marked the end of the private enterprise, "Pierer'schen Hofbuchdruckerei Stephan Geibel & Co."

The company was reconstituted as Betrieb und VEB Druckhaus "Maxim Gorki" Altenburg, the namesake of a Russian and Soviet writer and five-time nominee for the Nobel Prize in Literature.  In 1951, it was merged into Thüringer Volksverlag GmbH (de). From 1952 to 1990, the firm specialized in fiction and scientific publications. In 1956, the firm was transferred to the German Academy of Sciences at Berlin, and continued to print mostly scientific journals.

German reunification 
On August 15, 1990 – after the collapse of the GDR, and the reunification of Germany, the firm — under Treuhandanstalt, a government agency established to administer the selling of assets, including entire companies, that had been owned by the DDR — registered as Maxim-Gorki-Druck GmbH.  Among other things, the firm upgraded from lead typesetting to photographic reproduction and offset printing. Maxim-Gorki-Druck GmbH dissolved on December 17, 1992.

21st century 
In 1993, the assets were purchased by Simon Tafertshofer and registered as a private entity in the state of Thüringen, registered court of Jena, as Druckerei zu Altenburg GmbH.  The firm is currently known as DZA Druckerei zu Altenburg GmbH.  Tafertshofer is managing director.

Civic legacies 
In 1991, the District of Altenburger Land opened a trade school, Johann-Friedrich-Pierer-Schule Altenburg (de).

Selected published and printed works

Fürstlich Sächsischer Druckerei zu Torgau (1594–1604)
 (Torgauer Katechismus) Ein Christliches Handbüchlein, vor Die Durchlauchtige, Hochgeborne Fürstin und Fräulein, Fräulein Dorothea Sophia, und Fräulein Anna Maria, Hertzogin zu Sachssen, Landgräffin in Düringen, und Marggräffin zu Meißen, etc. Aus Christlicher, Gottseliger, und reiner Lehrer, Büchern und Schrifften zusam̄en getragen. Herr Jesu Christe, Segne meinen Eingang und Außgang, von nun an bis in Ewigkeit, In Fürstl[ich]. Sächs[ischer]. Druckerey zu Torgau, Anno M.D. XCIIII (1594);  (link via Deutsche Digitale Bibliothek (de), Martin Luther University of Halle-Wittenberg, Universitäts- und Landesbibliothek Sachsen-Anhalt (de))Later eds.1598 (Annaburg); 1601 (Torgau); 1634 (Leipzig) (alternate title), George Zöllner of Jena is credited as author in this edition; 
 D[octoris]. Martini Lutheri Concionum Deibus Dominicis et Festis domi publiceq́[ue]; habitarum Ad Mandatum Illustriss: et Celsissimi Principis A[uria]C[i] D[omi]N[i]:D[omi]n[i]: Friderici Wilhelmi, Ducis Saxoniæ, Tutoris et Electoratus Saxonici Administratoris, Landgr[aviorum]. Thuringiæ, et Marchionis Mismiæ, etç., In Latinum sermonem à M[agister]. Johanne Wanckelio [(de)] traductarum
 Pars I. Hyberna ("Winter") (1596); 
 Pars II. Æstiua ("Summer") (1596); 
 Pars III. Autumnalis et de Festis ("Autumn and Holidays") (1597); 
(these are teachings or sermons of Martin Luther, translated from German to Latin by Johanne Wanckel (de))

Gedruckt und Verlagen von Gottfried Richtern (1668–1670) / F.S. Hoff-Buchdruckern, Altenburg (1670–1709) 
 Die Neu-Zugerichtete Historische Confect-Taffel: Worauff in Einhundert anmuthigen, Schaaten, viel und mancherley außerlesene, sehr denckwürdige, und meistertheils neue Trauer- Lust- und Lehr-Geschichten also auffgesetzt worden: daß jedwede mit angenehmer Kürtze auffgetragene Erzehlung, einen sonderbahren Spruch H[eilige]. Schrifft, mit ihrer Hauptlehre bestätiget, und was bey denen vielfältigen Umbständen merckwürdig, durch beygefügte nützliche Erinnerungen, erbaulich gezeiget wird. Denen Geschichts-liebenden Gemüthern zu sonderbahren Nutz und Ergetzung verfertiget, und öffentlich auffgestellet Von M[agister]. Jacob Daniel Ernsten, P[astor]. [zu] C[riebitzsch]. (Jacob Daniel Ernst; 1640–1707)
 1677: 
 1681: 
 1682: 
 1690: 
 1698: , 
 1722: 
 Around thirty Latin and German poems published on Dorothea Friderica Kuntsch's death (January 1690, age 9)
 Latin and German poems by Christoph [von] Kuntsch's friends and colleagues, "Cerbum Luctum Quem Vir Praenobilissimus"; 
 Latin and German poems by local teachers and clergymen, "Cupressus Funerea in funere Virginis"; Selected poems:

Pierer'sche Hofbuchdruckerei, Stefan Geibel & Co., Altenburg (1872–1950) 
 "Das Ursprungsjahr des Montanismus" (subject: Montanism), by Daniel Völter (sv) (1855–1942), published as a 16-page book (1884);  Originally published in Zeitschrift für Wissenschaftliche Theologie (magazine), Adolf Hilgenfeld (ed.), Vol. 27, N° 1 (1883), pps. 23–36; 
 Unterm Birnbaum (de) (link via Google Books), by Theodor Fontane, Grote'sche Sammlung von Werken zeitgenössischer Schriftsteller (Grote's collection of works by Contemporary Writers), Dreiundzwanzigster Band (Vol. 23 of 77), Berlin: G. Grote'sche Verlagsbuchhandlung (publisher), Pierer’sche Hofbuchdruckerei. Stephan Geibel & Co. in Altenburg (printer) (1885);

Deutsche Akademie der Wissenschaften zu Berlin, Druckhaus "Maxim Gorki", Altenburg 
 Deutsches Jahrbuch für Volkskunde (academic periodical)Wilhelm Fraenger (1890–1964) (ed. 1955–1964)Hermann Strobach (de) (born 1925) (ed.; 1965–1969)Published by the Instutut für Deutsche Volkskunde (Institute for German Folklore) and the German Academy of Sciences at Berlin
1955 (Vol. 1) thru 1969 (Vol. 15), ; (all issues can be viewed online via , sponsored by Deutsche Forschungsgemeinschaft)

Photo gallery

Notes and references

Citations

External links
  — official website of the current printer, DZA Druckerei zu Altenburg GmbH
 Sample German publishers' announcements of new books, 1875-1919, Library of Congress , 

German printers
Altenburg
1594 establishments in Europe